Madhav Nori is an Indian mathematician. In 1980 he has received the INSA Medal for Young Scientists.

Career 

Nori was awarded his PhD in Mathematics in 1981 from the University of Mumbai. He studies within the fields of algebraic geometry and commutative algebra. His areas of interest in research focus on  algebraic cycles, K-theory, Hodge theory, Galois theory, and their interactions. Nori received the INSA Medal for Young Scientists in 1980 and is an elected Fellow of the Indian Academy of Sciences, Bangalore.

The fundamental group scheme 
Nori proved the existence of the fundamental group scheme  during his PhD work, using the theory of essentially finite vector bundles that he defined. There is a special family of vector bundles called Nori-semistable vector bundles in Nori's honor as he had the first intuition for their existence and properties.

References 

20th-century Indian mathematicians
21st-century Indian mathematicians
Living people
University of Mumbai alumni
Year of birth missing (living people)